Ficus scobina is one of several fig species commonly known as sandpaper fig. It is native to northern Australia, from the Kimberleys across to north Queensland.

References

scobina
Rosales of Australia
Trees of Australia
Flora of Queensland
Flora of Western Australia